The Atomiswave is a custom arcade system board and cabinet from Sammy Corporation. It is based on Sega's Dreamcast console, sharing similarities with the NAOMI, 
as far as it uses interchangeable game cartridges, as well as a removable module for changing the control scheme (including dual joysticks, dual light guns and a steering wheel), but unlike the NAOMI, the Atomiswave does not feature expanded RAM compared to the Dreamcast.

With the retirement of the aging Neo Geo MVS system, SNK Playmore chose the Atomiswave as its next system to develop games for. In a contract with Sammy, SNK Playmore agreed to develop five games for the Atomiswave system. Metal Slug 6 was SNK Playmore's fifth game for the Atomiswave, after which SNK moved on to a Taito Type X2 arcade board.

Specifications 

CPU: Hitachi SH-4 32-bit RISC CPU 200 MHz
Rated performance: 360 MIPS/1.4 GFLOPS
Graphics processor: PowerVR 2 100 MHz
Polygon performance: 3 to 5 million polygons/sec
Rendering speed: 500 M pixels/sec 
Additional features: bump mapping, fog, alpha-blending (transparency), MIP mapping (polygon-texture auto switch), tri-*linear filtering, anti-aliasing, environment mapping, and specular effect
Sound processor: ARM7 Yamaha AICA (with internal 32-bit RISC CPU, 64 channel ADPCM) 45 MHz
Memory
System: 16 MB
Graphics: 8 MB
Sound: 2 MB
Storage media: ROM board

AW-net 
In Japan, the Atomiswave was able to connect via a special modem to the AW-Net online system set up by Sammy. The AW-Net was primarily used to play online with other players and to create online player rankings. AW-Net was discontinued on 30 November 2006 following the merger of Sammy and Sega; the follow-up system was ALL.Net.

Games

Released

Unreleased 
Sushi Bar (Sammy, 2003)
Premier Eleven (Sammy/Dimps, 2003)
Chase 1929 (Sammy, 2004)
Force Five (Sammy, 2004)
Kenju (Sammy / DreamFactory, 2004)

References

External links 
http://atomiswave.forumer.com/
System16.com's Atomiswave Hardware page
https://segaretro.org/Atomiswave

Arcade system boards
Online video game services
SuperH architecture
Dreamcast